Harrison County is a county on the eastern border of the U.S. state of Texas. As of the 2020 United States census, its population was 68,839. The county seat is Marshall. The county was created in 1839 and organized in 1842. It is named for Jonas Harrison, a lawyer and Texas revolutionary.

Developed for cotton plantations by planters from the South, this county had the highest number of enslaved African Americans in Texas before the Civil War. They comprised 59% of the population. From 1870 to 1930, Blacks made up 60% of the county's population. In the post-Reconstruction era, whites used lynchings to assert their dominance, in addition to the state's disenfranchisement of blacks. 

From 1940 to 1970, in the second wave of the Great Migration, many blacks moved to the West Coast to escape Jim Crow and for work in the expanding defense industry. More whites have moved in since the late 20th century as the county's economy has developed beyond the rural, and now comprise the majority.

Harrison County comprises the Marshall micropolitan statistical area, which is also included in the Longview-Marshall combined statistical area. It is located in the Ark-La-Tex region.

History

Early history
Settlement by immigrants from the United States (US) began during the 1830s in the territory of present-day Harrison County. In 1835, the Mexican authorities granted a dozen land grants to U.S. immigrants. After the Texas Revolution, the Congress of the Texas Republic established Harrison County in 1839, formed from Shelby County. Harrison County was named for Texas revolutionary Jonas Harrison. The county was organized in 1842.

The county's area was reduced in 1846, as territory was taken to establish Panola and Upshur counties. Marshall was founded in 1841, and was designated as the county seat in 1842.

The area was settled predominately by planters from the Southern United States, who developed this area for cotton plantations and brought enslaved African Americans with them for labor, or purchased them at regional markets. The planters repeated much of their culture and society here. East Texas was the location of most of the cotton plantations in the state and, correspondingly, of most of the enslaved African Americans. 

Most of the fourteen black-majority, plantation counties were located in East Texas. By 1850, landowners in Harrison County held more slaves than in any other county in Texas until the end of the Civil War. The census of 1860 counted 8,746 slaves in Harrison County, 59% of the county's total population.

In 1861, the county's voters (who were exclusively white males and mostly upper class) overwhelmingly supported secession from the United States.

Reconstruction era to present
Following defeat at the end of the American Civil War, the county was part of an area occupied by Federal troops under Reconstruction. The white minority in the county bitterly resented federal authority and the constitutional amendment granting the franchise to freedmen. A majority in the county, the freedmen elected a bi-racial county government dominated by Republican Party officeholders. 

Republican dominance in local offices continued in the county until 1880, but the conservative whites of the Democratic Party regained control of the state government before the official end of Reconstruction. In 1880, the Citizen's Party of Harrison County, amid charges of fraud and coercion, gained control of elected positions in the county government after winning on a technicality, which involved hiding a key ballot box. They retained such control of the county into the 1950s, aided by the state's disenfranchisement of blacks at the turn of the century by a variety of laws, including those to permit white primaries. In addition, during the post-Reconstruction era, white terrorist violence was directed at blacks to assert white supremacy. According to records of the Equal Justice Initiative, Harrison County had the third-highest number of lynchings of any county in Texas, from 1877 to 1950.

In the 1870s the county's non-agricultural sector increased when the Texas and Pacific Railway located its headquarters and shops in Marshall. It stimulated other industry and manufacturing in the county, and also aided the transportation to market of the important cotton commodity crop.

But from 1880 to 1930, Harrison County remained primarily agricultural and rural. It had a 60 percent black majority through 1930. During this period, most of the African Americans worked in agriculture as tenant farmers and sharecroppers. 

Harrison County had a total of 14 lynchings. Most were committed in the early 20th century, particularly in the 1910s when the county suffered economic hard times. Whites "did not lynch in lieu of ineffective courts, but instead demonstrated to the black majority that legal protection and rights were inaccessible to blacks". Blacks accused of violence against law enforcement or who were from outside the county were particularly at risk, but the terrorist lynchings put all blacks on notice that whites could take action against them essentially at will. 

The Texas legislature disenfranchised most blacks in 1901 by requiring poll taxes and authorizing white primaries (after various iterations, the latter were overturned by a U.S. Supreme Court decision in 1944). This disenfranchisement extended into the late 1960s, until after national civil rights legislation was passed to enforce these citizens' constitutional civil rights.

In 1928, oil was discovered in the county. Its exploitation and processing made a significant contribution to the economy.

The Great Depression of the 1930s hit the county hard, decimating the agricultural sector. Mobilization for World War II brought an end to the depression. As the defense industry built up in major cities and on the West Coast, from 1940 to 1970, a total of more than 4.5 million blacks migrated from the South, particularly Texas, Louisiana, and Mississippi, for work and to escape continuing suppression under Jim Crow laws. They moved to the West Coast in the second wave of the Great Migration, attracted to new jobs in the expanding defense industry.

The population of the county declined until 1980, when the trend reversed. White migration from other areas has resulted in a majority-white population. In the realignment of parties in the South since the late 20th century, white conservative voters in Texas have left the Democratic Party to become overwhelmingly affiliated with the Republican Party.

Geography
The northern and eastern parts of the county are drained to the Red River in Louisiana by Little Cypress Creek, Cypress Bayou, and Caddo Lake. The other third of the county is drained by the Sabine River, which forms a part of its southern boundary. These waterways were critical to early transportation in the county.

Adjacent counties
 Marion County (north)
 Caddo Parish, Louisiana (east)
 Panola County (south)
 Rusk County (southwest)
 Gregg County (west)
 Upshur County (northwest)

Major highways

  Interstate 20
  U.S. Highway 59
  Interstate 369 is currently under construction and will follow the current route of U.S. 59 in most places.
  U.S. Highway 80
  State Highway 43
  State Highway 49
  State Highway 154
  Farm to Market Road 134
  Farm to Market Road 2208

The TTC-69 component (recommended preferred) of the once-planned Trans-Texas Corridor went through Harrison County.

National protected area
 Caddo Lake National Wildlife Refuge

Communities

Cities

 Hallsville
 Longview (mostly in Gregg County)
 Marshall (county seat and largest municipality)
 Scottsville
 Uncertain
 Waskom

Unincorporated communities

 Elysian Fields
 Gill
 Harleton
 Jonesville
 Karnack
 Latex
 Nesbitt
 Woodlawn

Demographics

Note: the US Census treats Hispanic/Latino as an ethnic category. This table excludes Latinos from the racial categories and assigns them to a separate category. Hispanics/Latinos can be of any race.

In 2000, the 2000 U.S. census reported there were 62,110 people, 23,087 households, and 16,945 families residing in the county. The population density was 69 people per square mile (27/km2). There were 26,271 housing units at an average density of 29 per square mile (11/km2). During July 2018's estimates by the United States Census Bureau, Harrison County had a population of 66,726. At the publication of the 2020 census, its population increased to 68,839.

At the 2000 census, the racial makeup of the county was 71.35% White, 24.03% Black or African American, 0.35% Native American, 0.31% Asian, 0.04% Pacific Islander, 2.86% from other races, and 1.06% from two or more races; 5.34% of the population were Hispanic or Latino of any race. In 2018, the racial makeup of Harrison County was 63.2% non-Hispanic white, 21.1% Black or African American, 1.2% American Indian or Alaska Native, 0.8% Asian, 0.1% Pacific Islander, and 1.7% from two or more races. Hispanics and Latino Americans of any race made up 13.6% of the populace. In 2020, the racial and ethnic makeup was 61.07% non-Hispanic white, 19.54% Black or African American, 0.43% Native American, 0.70% Asian, 0.04% Pacific Islander, 0.39% some other race, 3.55% multiracial, and 14.29% Hispanic or Latino American of any race; alongside statewide trends, the increase in traditionally minority populations reflected nationwide diversification.

The largest ancestry groups in Harrison County at the 2010 United States census were: English (41%), Black or African American (24%), Irish (8%), German (3%), Scotch-Irish (3%), Scottish (2%), Dutch (1%), Italian (1%), French or French Canadian (except Basque) (1%), Mexican (1%), and Polish (1%).

At the 2018 American Community Survey, the median household income was $51,202 and 14.7% of the population were below the poverty line. The median gross rent in the county was $779 from 2014 to 2018, and the median house monthly owner costs without mortgage were $403. The median with a mortgage was $1,266.

Education
The following school districts serve Harrison County:
 Elysian Fields ISD (partly in Panola County)
 Hallsville ISD
 Harleton ISD
 Marshall ISD
 Longview ISD (mostly in Gregg County)
 New Diana ISD (mostly in Upshur County)
 Ore City ISD (mostly in Upshur County, small portion in Marion County)
 Waskom ISD
 Karnack ISD

Politics
The county is represented in the Texas House of Representatives by Republican Chris Paddie, a former mayor of Marshall.

See also

 List of museums in East Texas
 National Register of Historic Places listings in Harrison County, Texas
 Recorded Texas Historic Landmarks in Harrison County

References

Further reading
 Randolph B. Campbell, A Southern Community in Crisis: Harrison County, Texas, 1850–1880 (Austin: Texas State Historical Association, 1983).

External links

 Harrison County government's website
 
 Historic materials about Harrison County, hosted by the Portal to Texas History

 
1842 establishments in the Republic of Texas
Populated places established in 1842